Giacomo Pacchiarotti or Jacopo Pacchiarotto (1474 – 1539 or 1540) was an Italian painter.

Life and Works
He was born in Siena, and worked there.  Bernardino Fungai may have been his teacher; Pacchiarotti's style is influenced by Fungai, as well as Matteo di Giovanni, Perugino, and Signorelli. He fled to France where he joined Rosso Fiorentino in the work at Fontainebleau. He may be the Girolamo di Pacchia mentioned by Vasari in his chapter on il Sodoma. He painted a St. Catherine and St. Catherine visits the body of Agnes of Montepulciano now in the Pinacoteca of Siena. He painted frescoes on the Birth of the Virgin and the Annunciation for the church of San Bernardino.

A number of his paintings are in Siena.

He is recorded as having been a designer for pageants, and was active in the Sienese resistance against Florence.

One of his most important works is a tempera on panel representing the Madonna and Child with Saints, was once housed in the Church of Santi Margherita e Matteo in Ortignano Raggiolo, in the province of Arezzo.

'Pacchiarotto, and How He Worked in Distemper'
Pacchiarotto, and How He Worked in Distemper is the title poem of a collection of the same name by Robert Browning, published in 1876. Based loosely on the painter's role in the Sienese resistance, it is a comic poem attacking Browning's critics.

References

External links
Artnet bio
Italian Paintings: Sienese and Central Italian Schools, a collection catalog containing information about Pacchiarotti and his works (see index; plates 82-83).

1474 births
16th-century deaths
15th-century Italian painters
Italian male painters
16th-century Italian painters
Painters from Siena